The Malayan black magpie (Platysmurus leucopterus) is a species of bird in the family Corvidae. Despite its name, it is neither a magpie nor, as was long believed, a jay, but a treepie. Treepies are a distinct group of corvids externally similar to magpies.

Distribution and habitat
It is found in Brunei, Indonesia, Malaysia, Myanmar, Singapore, and Thailand. The Bornean black magpie (P. atterimus) was formerly considered a subspecies. The natural habitats of the Malayan black magpie are subtropical or tropical moist lowland forest and subtropical or tropical mangrove forest. It is threatened by habitat loss.

References

Cited texts
 

Platysmurus
Birds of Malesia
Malayan black magpie
Taxonomy articles created by Polbot